"Yah" (stylized as "YAH.") is a song by American rapper Kendrick Lamar, from his fourth studio album Damn, released on April 14, 2017. The third track on the album (twelfth on the Collector's Edition of Damn), the song was written by Lamar, Mark Spears, a.k.a. Sounwave, DJ Dahi, and Anthony Tiffith, and produced by, Sounwave, DJ Dahi, and Tiffith, with additional production by Bēkon.

The song's title refers to "Yahweh", a romanization of the name of the Abrahamic God in the Hebrew Bible (יהוה).

Lyrics 
The song shows Lamar expressing his inner thoughts, a subject he rarely touches upon in interviews.

In the lyrics, Lamar calls out Fox News' reporter Geraldo Rivera, who criticized Lamar's performance of "Alright" at the BET Awards 2015.

The song makes multiple references to religion, a theme Lamar would reference multiple times throughout Damn. Lamar specifically references the Book of Deuteronomy, the fifth book from the Hebrew Bible and the Christian Old Testament. Lamar mentions his cousin, Carl Duckworth, who teaches Lamar about the Book of Deuteronomy and how the book talks about penalties for breaking the rule of God. A voicemail snippet from Carl appears in the song "Fear", also from Damn, during which he espouses the beliefs of the Hebrew Israelite group where he is a member. At one point, Lamar raps "I'm a Israelite, don't call me black no mo'," which is a clear reference to Black Israelism.

According to Spin magazine, the song drew influence from American rapper Kanye West's song "Jesus Walks" from his first studio album The College Dropout, a song that also drew biblical allusions.

Credits and personnel 
Credits adapted from the official Damn digital booklet.
Kendrick Lamar – songwriter
Mark Spears – songwriter, producer
Dacoury Natche – songwriter, producer
Anthony Tiffith – songwriter, producer
Bēkon – additional production, additional vocals
Derek Ali – mixing
Tyler Page – mix assistant
Cyrus Taghipour – mix assistant
Geraldo Rivera – additional vocals

Charts

Certifications

References 

2017 songs
Kendrick Lamar songs
Songs written by Kendrick Lamar
Songs written by DJ Dahi
Songs written by Sounwave